As of November 2021, ASL Airlines Belgium serves six scheduled freight destinations in North America and China under its own brand name with several dozen more operated as contracted charters, e. g. on behalf of DHL.

ASL Airlines Belgium destinations
 
 Liège - Liège Airport Hub
 
 Halifax - Halifax Stanfield International Airport
 
 Hangzhou - Hangzhou Xiaoshan International Airport
 Jinan - Jinan Yaoqiang International Airport
 Shanghai - Shanghai Pudong International Airport
 
 Chicago - Chicago O'Hare International Airport
 New York City - John F. Kennedy International Airport

Contracted destinations

Africa

North Africa 
 
 Agadir - Agadir–Al Massira Airport
 Marrakech - Marrakesh Menara Airport
 Tangier - Tangier Ibn Battouta Airport
 
 Djerba - Djerba–Zarzis International Airport
 Tunis - Tunis–Carthage International Airport (cargo)

Asia

East Asia 
 
 Hong Kong International Airport (cargo)

South Asia 
 
 Delhi - Indira Gandhi International Airport (cargo)

Southeast Asia 
 
 Singapore Changi Airport (cargo)

Southwest Asia 
 
 Tel Aviv - Ben Gurion Airport
 
 Dubai - Dubai International Airport

Europe

Central Europe 
 
 Innsbruck - Innsbruck Airport
 Vienna - Vienna International Airport
 
 Basel - EuroAirport Basel Mulhouse Freiburg
 Geneva - Geneva Airport

Eastern Europe 
 
 Sofia - Sofia Airport
 
 Brno - Brno–Tuřany Airport
 Prague - Václav Havel Airport Prague
 
 Tallinn - Tallinn Airport
 
 Budapest - Budapest Ferenc Liszt International Airport
 
 Gdańsk - Gdańsk Lech Wałęsa Airport
 Katowice - Katowice International Airport
 Warsaw - Warsaw Chopin Airport
 
 Bucharest - Henri Coandă International Airport
 
 Moscow - Sheremetyevo International Airport
 Novosibirsk - Novosibirsk Tolmachevo Airport

Northern Europe 
 
 Billund - Billund Airport
 
 Helsinki - Helsinki Airport
 Turku - Turku Airport
 
 Oslo - Oslo Gardermoen Airport
 
 Gothenburg - Göteborg Landvetter Airport
 Jönköping - Jönköping Airport
 Malmö - Malmö Airport
 Örebro - Örebro Airport
 Stockholm - Stockholm Västerås Airport

Southern Europe 
 
 Larnaca - Larnaca International Airport
 
 Athens - Athens International Airport
 Corfu - Corfu International Airport
 Heraklion - Heraklion International Airport
 
 Bergamo - Orio al Serio International Airport
 Bologna - Bologna Guglielmo Marconi Airport
 Cagliari - Cagliari Elmas Airport
 Catania - Catania–Fontanarossa Airport
 Lamezia Terme - Lamezia Terme International Airport
 Milan - Milan–Malpensa Airport
 Montichiari - Brescia Airport
 Olbia - Olbia Costa Smeralda Airport
 Rome - Ciampino–G. B. Pastine International Airport
 
 Luqa - Malta International Airport
 
 Lisbon - Lisbon Airport
 Porto - Porto Airport
 
 Ljubljana - Ljubljana Jože Pučnik Airport
 Maribor - Maribor Edvard Rusjan Airport
 
 Alicante - Alicante–Elche Airport
 Barcelona - Barcelona–El Prat Airport
 Madrid - Adolfo Suárez Madrid–Barajas Airport
 Palma de Mallorca - Palma de Mallorca Airport
 Seville - Seville Airport
 Valencia - Valencia Airport
 Vitoria - Vitoria Airport
 Zaragoza - Zaragoza Airport
 
 Antalya - Antalya Airport
 Bodrum - Milas–Bodrum Airport
 Istanbul - Istanbul Atatürk Airport

Western Europe 
 
 Brussels - Brussels Airport
 Charleroi - Brussels South Charleroi Airport
 Liège - Liège Airport Hub
 
 Ajaccio - Ajaccio Napoleon Bonaparte Airport
 Bordeaux - Bordeaux–Mérignac Airport
 Lourdes/Tarbes - Tarbes–Lourdes–Pyrénées Airport
 Lyon - Lyon–Saint-Exupéry Airport
 Marseille - Marseille Provence Airport
 Paris - Charles de Gaulle Airport
 Toulouse - Toulouse–Blagnac Airport
 Rennes - Rennes–Saint-Jacques Airport
 
 Berlin -  Berlin Tegel Airport
 Erfurt - Erfurt Airport
 Frankfurt - Frankfurt Airport
 Hannover - Hanover Airport
 Munich - Munich Airport
 Nuremberg - Nuremberg Airport
 
 Dublin - Dublin Airport
 Shannon - Shannon Airport
 
 Amsterdam - Amsterdam Airport Schiphol
 Maastricht - Maastricht Aachen Airport
 
 Bristol - Bristol Airport 
 Belfast - Belfast International Airport
 Edinburgh - Edinburgh Airport
 London - London Stansted Airport
 Newcastle upon Tyne - Newcastle International Airport
 Nottingham - East Midlands Airport
 Norwich - Norwich International Airport

America

North America 
 
 Atlanta - Hartsfield–Jackson Atlanta International Airport
 
 Guadalajara - Guadalajara International Airport

Oceania

Australasia 
 
 Sydney - Sydney Airport (cargo)

References

ASL Airlines Belgium